County Seat was an American clothing retailer founded in 1973. With more than 740 stores at its peak, the chain closed in 1999 following Chapter 11 bankruptcy.

History
Jack J. Crocker, then the CEO of SuperValu supermarkets, founded the chain in 1973 in Dallas, Texas. Appropriate for the pun in its name, County Seat specialized in blue jeans and other casual wear. 

In 1977, the chain grew to 183 stores, and also began to sell sports clothing. 

In 1983, it was sold to the Carson Pirie Scott department store chain of Chicago, who bought County Seat for $71 million. Two years later, Carson Pirie Scott acquired the 19-store Pants Corral store from Giant Food of Landover, Maryland, and converted these to County Seat.

Carson Pirie Scott redesigned the chain's stores with matte black fixtures and re-focused the merchandise line to target high schoolers. The chain had 415 stores in 1989, at which point Bergner's acquired Carson Pirie Scott and sold County Seat to a new management team.

Wet Seal offered to buy 508 stores of the County Seat chain in 1996, but was rejected. The chain filed for Chapter 11 bankruptcy protection in late 1996 and began to close stores. County Seat filed for bankruptcy again in 1999.

References

Clothing retailers of the United States
Companies based in Dallas
Defunct companies based in Texas
Defunct clothing retailers of the United States
Retail companies established in 1973
Retail companies disestablished in 1999
Companies that filed for Chapter 11 bankruptcy in 1996
Companies that filed for Chapter 11 bankruptcy in 1999
1973 establishments in Texas
1999 disestablishments in Texas